Facundo Jorge Imboden (born 2 February 1980 in Buenos Aires) is an Argentine football full back who last played for Ferro Carril Oeste.

Career

In 2010, Imboden joined Argentine second division side Ferro Carril Oeste.

Honours

Club
Universidad Católica
 Primera División de Chile (1): 2005 Clausura

References

External links
 Argentine Primera statistics

1980 births
Living people
Footballers from Buenos Aires
Argentine people of German descent
Association football defenders
Argentine footballers
Argentine expatriate footballers
Boca Juniors footballers
Club Atlético Belgrano footballers
Millonarios F.C. players
Olimpo footballers
Club Deportivo Universidad Católica footballers
Club de Gimnasia y Esgrima La Plata footballers
Ferro Carril Oeste footballers
C.D. Cuenca footballers
Chilean Primera División players
Argentine Primera División players
Categoría Primera A players
Ecuadorian Serie A players
Expatriate footballers in Chile
Expatriate footballers in Colombia
Expatriate footballers in Ecuador